Flickertail may refer to:

Richardson's Ground Squirrel or Flickertail, a North American ground squirrel in the genus Urocitellus
North Dakota, nicknamed the Flickertail State
SS Flickertail State (T-ACS-5), a crane ship in ready reserve for the United States Navy